Aquilino Pimentel may refer to:
Aquilino Pimentel Jr. (1933-2019), also known as Nene Pimentel, former senator of the Philippines (1987–1992, 1998–2010)
Aquilino Pimentel III (born 1964), also known as Koko Pimentel, senator of the Philippines (2011-present)